Cydia adenocarpi is a species of moth belonging to the family Tortricidae.

Synonym:
 Grapholitha adenocarpi Ragonot, 1875 (= basionym)

References

Grapholitini
Moths described in 1875